Marjorie Acosta-Ruiz,  known professionally as MJ Acosta-Ruiz, is a Dominican-American sports reporter for NFL Network.

Early life and education
Acosta grew up in Washington Heights, Manhattan in New York City before moving to Miami, Florida, where she attended Miami Sunset Senior High School and her father is a former professional basketball player from the Dominican Republic. Acosta attended Barry University where she graduated in 2011 with a Bachelors of Arts degree in Communications.

Career
Acosta was an NFL cheerleader for the Miami Dolphins for the 2012 and 2013 seasons. Prior to joining Telemundo 20, Acosta was a sports reporter at WPLG-TV, the ABC's affiliate in Miami and Fort Lauderdale.  Acosta was covering the NFL's San Diego Chargers as a reporter at Telemundo 20 in San Diego since joining the station in 2016. In August 2018, Acosta announced that she would be leaving San Diego's Telemundo 20 for NFL Network as their Bay Area-based reporter for the San Francisco 49ers and Oakland Raiders.

References

External links
NFL Network/On Air Talent Profile

American television reporters and correspondents

Living people
Year of birth missing (living people)